Sir Keith John Lindblom, PC (born 20 September 1956), styled The Rt Hon Lord Justice Lindblom, is a Queen's Counsel and current Lord Justice of Appeal in the Court of Appeal.

Career
He was educated at Whitgift School and St John's College, Oxford. He was subsequently called to the Bar in 1980 and took silk in 1996 to become a Queen's Counsel.  He was appointed as a Recorder in 2001 and a deputy High Court Judge in 2009.

He was approved as a Justice of the High Court in 2010 and assigned to the Queen's Bench Division, being awarded the customary knighthood. He heard the first instance proceedings concerning legality of the Occupy London movement outside St. Paul's Cathedral.

Lindblom was appointed as President of the Upper Tribunal Lands Chamber on 1 January 2013. He was appointed as a Lord Justice of Appeal on 2 November 2015. He was appointed to the Privy Council of the United Kingdom in 2016.

Lord Justice Lindblom was appointed as Senior President of Tribunals effective from 19 September 2020 following the retirement of Sir Ernest Ryder.

See also
 List of High Court judges of England and Wales

References

1956 births
Living people
Members of the Privy Council of the United Kingdom
People educated at Whitgift School
Alumni of St John's College, Oxford
21st-century English judges
Queen's Bench Division judges
Lords Justices of Appeal
Knights Bachelor
English King's Counsel